Porta d'Europa is a bascule bridge in the Port of Barcelona in Barcelona. It is 106 metres long. It was designed by Juan José Arenas de Pablo and completed in July 2000.

See also 
 Sant Boi Bridge

References

External links 
 

Buildings and structures in Barcelona
Bridges in Catalonia
Road bridges in Spain
Bascule bridges
Bridges completed in 2000
2000 establishments in Spain